The 1994 Skate Canada International was held in Red Deer, Alberta on November 3–6. Medals were awarded in the disciplines of men's singles, ladies' singles, pair skating, and ice dancing.

Results

Men

Ladies

Pairs

Ice dancing

References

Sources
 Patinage Magazine N°45, p. 65
 Official Protocol

Skate Canada International, 1994
Skate Canada International
1994 in Canadian sports 
1994 in Alberta